Antioch School may refer to:

Antioch School (Anamosa, Iowa), listed on the National Register of Historic Places in Jones County, Iowa
Antioch School (Pauline, Nebraska), listed on the National Register of Historic Places in Adams County, Nebraska
Antioch School (Yellow Springs, Ohio), oldest democratic school in the United States
Antioch Dependent School District No. 15, Elmore City, Oklahoma, listed on the National Register of Historic Places in Garvin County, Oklahoma
Catechetical School of Antioch of early Christianity